Felton Jeffrey Capel II (January 6, 1953 – November 13, 2017) was an American National Basketball Association assistant coach, and, prior to that, a college basketball head coach. He was head coach of the Old Dominion Monarchs team from 1994 to 2001, of the North Carolina A&T Aggies from 1993 to 1994 and of the Fayetteville State Broncos from 1989 to 1993. He was the father of Pittsburgh Panthers head coach Jeff Capel III and former Appalachian State Mountaineers head coach Jason Capel. He was also an assistant coach with the NBA's Charlotte Bobcats. On November 15, 2011, it was announced that Capel was hired as an assistant coach for the Philadelphia 76ers.

Early life
Born in Southern Pines, North Carolina, Capel graduated from Pinecrest High School in 1970. He went to Fayetteville State University and played on the basketball team as a freshman, then served in the United States Army from 1971 to 1975. Capel says that serving in the Army provided discipline and structure in his life. Capel returned to Fayetteville State and played another season on the basketball team as a senior before graduating in 1977 with a degree in health and physical education.

Coaching career
In 1978, Capel returned to his alma mater Pinecrest High School to be a volunteer basketball coach. He also coached wrestling, baseball, and junior varsity football at Pinecrest. He then was the head varsity basketball coach from 1980 to 1986. Capel also was an assistant principal at Pinecrest.

From 1986 to 1989, Capel was an assistant coach at Wake Forest University under Bob Staak.

Fayetteville State hired Capel as head coach in 1989. In four seasons (1989–1993), Capel had a 63–51 record at Fayetteville State, with berths in the 1991 CIAA basketball tournament semi-finals and 1992 NCAA tournament. Future NBA player Darrell Armstrong was among players Capel coached.

In the 1993–94 season, Capel was head coach at North Carolina A&T, who finished 16–14 with the MEAC tournament championship and automatic berth in the NCAA tournament. Capel then was head coach at Old Dominion from 1994 to 2001. Under Capel, Old Dominion won two CAA tournament championships (1995 and 1997). Old Dominion made the second round of the 1995 NCAA tournament and first round of the 1997 NCAA tournament, as well as the second round of the 1999 National Invitation Tournament. At Old Dominion, Capel had a 122–98 record.

In 2001, the Fayetteville Patriots of the NBA's startup minor league National Basketball Development League (NBDL) hired Capel as head coach. Capel was head coach from 2001 to 2004; the Patriots finished first in the NBDL for the 2002–03 season and were runners-up in the 2003 NBDL Finals.
 
From 2004 to 2011, Capel was an assistant coach for the NBA expansion team Charlotte Bobcats. He was then an assistant coach for the Philadelphia 76ers from 2011 to 2013. On January 25, 2017, writing in The Players' Tribune, his son Jeff Capel III disclosed that Capel had been diagnosed in 2014 with Amyotrophic lateral sclerosis. He died on November 13, 2017, from the disease.

Head coaching record

College

Professional

|-
|align=left|Fayetteville Patriots
|align=left|2001–02
|34||16||18||||align=center|7th||–||–||–||–
|align=center|Missed playoffs
|-
|align=left|Fayetteville Patriots
|align=left|2002–03
|46||29||17||||align=center|1st||5||3||2||
|align=center|Lost in NBDL Finals
|-
|align=left|Fayetteville Patriots
|align=left|2003–04
|46||21||25||||align=center|4th||1||0||1||
|align=center|Lost in Semifinals
|- class="sortbottom"
| style="text-align:left;"|Career
| ||126||66||60|||| ||6||3||3||
|}

References

External links
 NBA profile
 Fayetteville Patriots profile (2003)
 Old Dominion profile  (2000)

1953 births
2017 deaths
African-American basketball coaches
African-American basketball players
Basketball coaches from North Carolina
Basketball players from North Carolina
Charlotte Bobcats assistant coaches
College men's basketball head coaches in the United States
Fayetteville Patriots coaches
Fayetteville State Broncos basketball coaches
Fayetteville State Broncos basketball players
High school basketball coaches in North Carolina
North Carolina A&T Aggies men's basketball coaches
Old Dominion Monarchs men's basketball coaches
Neurological disease deaths in North Carolina
Deaths from motor neuron disease
Philadelphia 76ers assistant coaches
United States Army soldiers
Wake Forest Demon Deacons men's basketball coaches
People from Southern Pines, North Carolina
American men's basketball players
20th-century African-American sportspeople
21st-century African-American people